Michalandreas Nyktaris (born 30 December 1999) is a Greek professional footballer who plays as a midfielder.

References

1999 births
Living people
Greek footballers
Greek expatriate footballers
Super League Greece players
Cypriot First Division players
Super League Greece 2 players
Football League (Greece) players
Gamma Ethniki players
Karmiotissa FC players
Veria F.C. players
Irodotos FC players
Apollon Larissa F.C. players
Association football midfielders
Footballers from Rethymno